Florence is a ghost town in Florence Township, Goodhue County, in the U.S. state of Minnesota.

History
A post office was established at Florence in 1858, and remained in operation until it was discontinued in 1867.

References

Ghost towns in Minnesota